The 2012 Finn Gold Cup, and the official Finn World Championships, were held in Falmouth, United Kingdom, between 13 and 18 May 2012. The hosting yacht club was Royal Cornwall Yacht Club.

Results

References

Finn Gold Cup
Finn Gold Cup
Finn Gold Cup
Finn Gold Cup
International sports competitions hosted by England
Falmouth, Cornwall
2010s in Cornwall
Sailing competitions in the United Kingdom